Walgrove is an unincorporated community in Kanawha County, in the U.S. state of West Virginia.

History
A post office called Walgrove was established in 1917, and remained in operation until 1937. The community was named for a grove of walnut trees near the original town site.

References

Unincorporated communities in Kanawha County, West Virginia
Unincorporated communities in West Virginia